Akira Nishino may refer to:

 Akira Nishino (footballer) (born 1955), Japanese football player and manager
 Akira Nishino (politician) (born 1940), Japanese politician